Václav Ondřejka (born 30 April 1988) is a professional Czech football player who for most of his career played for 1. FC Slovácko. He currently plays for Spartak Hulín in lower Czech tier.

References

External links
 
 
 Guardian Football 

Czech footballers
1988 births
Living people
Czech First League players
1. FC Slovácko players
FK Mladá Boleslav players
Association football forwards